The 2019–20 New Zealand Football Championship season (currently known as the ISPS Handa Premiership for sponsorship reasons) was the sixteenth season of the NZFC since its establishment, in 2004. Ten teams compete in the competition with Eastern Suburbs and Auckland City representing the ISPS Handa Premiership in the 2020 OFC Champions League after finishing Champions (Eastern Suburbs) and Premiers (Auckland City) respectively in the 2018–19 competition.

Clubs

Managerial changes

Regular season

League table
On 18 March 2020, New Zealand Football announced that the 2019–20 New Zealand Football Championship season had been concluded due to the COVID-19 pandemic. The remaining two rounds of the regular season and the finals series were cancelled. Auckland City, who were leading the regular season table, were declared champions and also awarded the Minor Premiership, and qualified for the 2021 OFC Champions League together with Team Wellington, who were at second place in the regular season table.

Positions by round

Notes:
 Southern United beat Tasman United 4–0 in round 1, however it was ruled by NZ Football that they had played an ineligible player so forfeited the result. This meant the win was awarded as a 3–0 result to Tasman United.

Fixtures and results
The season was scheduled to be played on a home and away basis between November 2019 and March 2020, with the finals series being played in April 2020.

Round 1

*Southern United beat Tasman United 4–0 however it was ruled by NZ Football that they had played an ineligible player so forfeited the result. This meant the win was awarded as a 3–0 result to Tasman United.

Round 2

Round 3

Round 4

Round 5

Round 6

Round 7

Round 8

Round 9

Round 10

Round 11

Round 12

Round 13

Round 14

Round 15

Round 16

Round 17

Round 18

Round 19

Round 20

Finals series

Semi-finals

Grand final

Statistics

Top scorers

Hat-tricks

References

External links
 ISPS Handa Premiership website 

New Zealand Football Championship seasons
2019–20 in New Zealand association football
New Zealand Football Championship
New Zealand Football Championship
New Zealand